Carl Christian Gottsche (1 March 1855, Altona – 11 October 1909) was a German geologist. He is known for geological investigations of Schleswig-Holstein and neighboring regions.

He studied geology at the Universities of Würzburg and Munich, obtaining his doctorate in 1878 with a thesis on Jurassic fossils from the Argentine Cordillera. In 1880 he became an assistant at the mineralogical institute in Kiel, receiving his habilitation the same year with a dissertation on sedimentary-drift in the Province of Schleswig-Holstein. 

In 1881 he relocated to Japan, where he was tasked with completing the establishment of a mineralogical-geological institute at the University of Tokyo. At the university he also gave lectures. For much of 1884 he conducted research in Korea, afterwards returning to Germany, where in 1886 he was appointed curator of the mineralogical-geological department of the Natural History Museum in Hamburg. In 1900 he attained the title of professor, later becoming director of the mineralogical-geological institute (1907).

He was the son of botanist Carl Moritz Gottsche (1808-1892).

Taxa named in honor
Taxa named in honor of Carl Christian Gottsche include:
 Semisulcospira gottschei (Martens, 1886)

Written works 
 Ueber jurassische Versteinerungen aus der argentinischen Cordillere (graduation thesis).
 Die sedimentärgeschiebe der Provinz Schleswig-Holstein (habilitation thesis).
 Die Mollusken-Fauna des Holsteiner Gesteins, 1887 - Mollusks found in Holstein rock formations.
 Kreide und Tertiär bei Hemmoor in Nord-Hannover, 1889 - Chalk and Tertiary near Hemmoor in North Hanover.

References 
 Dansk Geologisk Forening (translated biography)

1855 births
1909 deaths

19th-century German geologists
Scientists from Hamburg